We're Rich Again is a 1934 American comedy-drama film directed by William A. Seiter and starring Edna May Oliver, Billie Burke, and Marian Nixon. It is based on the play And Who Will Be Clever by Alden Nash.

Plot
In Santa Barbara, California, the formerly wealthy Page family tries to stave off bill collectors and repossessors for three days until Carolyn marries a rich man.

Cast
Edna May Oliver as Maude Stanley
Billie Burke as Linda Page
Marian Nixon as Arabella Sykes (as Marion Nixon)
Reginald Denny as Bookington "Bookie" Wells
Joan Marsh as Carolyn "Carrie" Page
Buster Crabbe as Erasmus Rockwell "Erp" Pennington (as Larry "Buster" Crabbe)
Grant Mitchell as Wilbur Page
Gloria Shea as Victoria "Vic" Page
Edgar Kennedy as Healy
Otto Yamaoka as Fugi
Lenita Lane as Charmion
Dick Elliott as Fred Green
Andrés de Segurola as Jose (as Andreas de Segurola)

External links

1934 films
1934 comedy-drama films
American black-and-white films
American comedy-drama films
American films based on plays
Films directed by William A. Seiter
Films set in Santa Barbara, California
1930s American films
1930s English-language films